The carosello is a landrace variety of muskmelon (Cucumis melo) found in Southern Italy. It is common in the Apulia region of Italy.

Varieties
Carosello barese is a rare heirloom variety of carosello. "Barese" means "from Bari", the major port city of Apulia.

Another variety is the Barattiere "Tondo Liscio" (rounded smooth) of Manduria, an Apulian city which was an ancient Messapian settlement.

Uses
In Italian cuisine, carosello is used in the same manner as the cucumber. It is typically consumed in an immature, unripened state.

See also
 Ark of Taste
 Barattiere – another landrace variety of muskmelon

References

Further reading
 
 

Melons
Landraces
Ark of Taste foods